Carex bebbii, Bebb's sedge, is a species of sedge native to the northern United States and Canada. Carex bebbii grows in a variety of wetland habitats such as lakeshores, streambanks, ditches, meadows, swamps, and seeps. It forms dense tufts with culms up to 90 centimeters tall.

References

bebbii
Plants described in 1902
Flora of North America